Lambula punctifer is a moth of the family Erebidae. It was described by George Hampson in 1900. It is known only from a few specimens collected on New Guinea, including Fakfak, the Setekwa River and the Utakwa River.

References

Lithosiina
Moths described in 1900